William Howell Taylor (born October 16, 1961) is an American former professional baseball player who pitched in Major League Baseball (MLB) primarily as a closer from 1994 and 1996–2001.

Early career
Billy Taylor played his first professional game in 1980 after being drafted by the Texas Rangers in the second round (39th overall pick) of the 1980 draft. Initially drafted as a starter, in 1981, he went 4–2 with a 2.72 ERA in Rookie-Level. However, he struggled after a promotion to Single-A, going just 1–7 with a 4.64 ERA. Over the next two seasons, used as a combination reliever/starter, he went 13–18 with a 5.54 ERA. He did strike out 212 batters. In 1984, used in 42 games, he re-established his prospect status with a 5–3 record and a 3.83 ERA in AA. In 1985, he topped 100 innings pitched for the first time in his career, and he also had a 3.47 ERA. He then threw 169 innings between AA and AAA and pitched fairly well with a 4.36 ERA between the two stops. He was only 24 years old. The next season, he pitched poorly, going 12–9 with a 5.61 ERA. Again, he threw about 170 innings. The next year, Taylor got injured and started only 11 games with an ERA of 5.49. Granted free agency by the Rangers, he signed in 1989 with the Padres, who needed depth in their bullpen. He appeared in 49 games in AAA, with again a high ERA of 5.13.

First success
By 1990, Taylor's career appeared to be over. He was 28 years old and had pitched poorly in AAA as both a starter and a reliever. However, the Atlanta Braves signed him in the middle of August 1990, seeing that his walk rate in 1989 was the lowest it had been in his minor league career. He appeared in 7 games that season. In 1991, no one could have predicted that he would go 6–2 in 59 games as a reliever with a 1.51 ERA in AA, morphing into one of the best closers in that league. 1992 was more of the same for Taylor. He went 2–3 with a 2.28 ERA and 12 saves. In 1993, at the age of 31, he was an All-Star, saved 26 games, struck out more than a batter an inning, and had a 1.98 ERA, all in AAA. He won the league's reliever of the year award as well.

Major League career
In 1994, a full 14 years after Billy Taylor had been drafted, he finally played in the big leagues. With a 3.50 ERA, he was arguably the most important reliever in the A's bullpen. From 1996 to 1999, Taylor saved 99 games. His best season came in 1998, where he had 33 saves (eighth in the AL), and a 3.58 ERA. On July 31, 1999, he was traded by the Oakland Athletics to the New York Mets for Jason Isringhausen and Greg McMichael. He then played for the Mets, Tampa Bay Devil Rays, and Pittsburgh Pirates before retiring from baseball.

External links
, or Retrosheet

1961 births
Living people
American expatriate baseball players in Canada
Asheville Tourists players
Baseball players from Florida
Burlington Rangers players
Durham Bulls players
Greenville Braves players
Edmonton Trappers players
Gulf Coast Rangers players
Las Vegas Stars (baseball) players
Major League Baseball pitchers
Nashville Sounds players
Navegantes del Magallanes players
American expatriate baseball players in Venezuela
New York Mets players
Oakland Athletics players
Oklahoma City 89ers players
People from Monticello, Florida
Pittsburgh Pirates players
Richmond Braves players
Salem Redbirds players
Tampa Bay Devil Rays players
Tulsa Drillers players
Wausau Timbers players